Biery  is a village in Gmina Jasienica, Bielsko County, Silesian Voivodeship, southern Poland. It has a population of 1,284 (2016). It lies in the historical region of Cieszyn Silesia.

The village was created in the 16th century by the owners of Grodziec. Originally it was named Birowy, and first appeared on a map from 1563. However other source from 1610, issued by Adam Wenceslaus, Duke of Cieszyn, cites a privilege from 1554, where the village was already supposedly mentioned.

There is a Catholic Heart of Jesus church in the village.

Inventor Józef Bożek was born here in 1782.

Footnotes

References

External links 
  Information at Gmina Jasienica website

Villages in Bielsko County
Cieszyn Silesia